Finnea is a small village in County Westmeath on the border with County Cavan. It straddles the R394 road, in the northern portion of Ireland.

Transport
Bus Éireann route 447 provides a link to Castlepollard, Crookedwood and Mullingar on Thursdays only. The nearest railway station is Edgeworthstown railway station approximately 22 km. distant.

History

The village is known for its association with Myles "The Slasher" O'Reilly whose monument in the town (pictured) relates how he died on 5 August 1646 defending the Bridge of Finnea against English forces. Percy French also mentioned the Bridge of Finnea in his ballad "Come Back Paddy Reilly".

Finnea lies on land between Lough Sheelin and Lough Kinale, and the bridge crosses the River Inny flowing between them. 

Finnea is also the birthplace of writer Dermot Healy. Thomas Davis celebrated Finnea with his ballad 'The Flower of Finnea'. Finnea is also known for its scenery, fishing and game shooting which attract many foreign tourists.

Victoria Cross recipient, General Sir Mark Walker, was born in Gore Port, Finnea. He was the brother of Sir Samuel Walker, 1st Baronet, who was appointed Lord Chancellor of Ireland by Gladstone in 1892.

Demographics
The area had a population of 317 in the 2006 Census, a 21.9% increase from the 2002 Census.

Notable residents
General Sir Mark Walker, recipient of the Victoria Cross and his younger brother Sir Samuel Walker, 1st Baronet, Lord Chancellor of Ireland.

Gallery

See also
 List of towns and villages in Ireland
 Market Houses in Ireland

References

Towns and villages in County Westmeath